Gearóid Ó hAllmhuráin (born 28 May 1955) is an Irish ethnomusicologist, author, musician and historian specialising in Irish music, diaspora, cultural and memory studies.

Profile
Born in Ennis, County Clare, Ó hAllmhuráin was a former member of The Kilfenora Céilí Band. He is a five-times All Ireland Champion musician (uilleann pipes, concertina and céili band). He learned from Clare concertina master Paddy Murphy. He has performed and recorded with noted Irish fiddlers Paddy Canny, Peadar O'Loughlin, Martin Hayes, and Patrick Ourceau, as well as French-Canadian fiddle master Pierre Schryer.

Ó hAllmhuráin studied at University College Cork, Trinity College Dublin, Université de la Sorbonne (Paris IV), Université de Toulon et du Var, and received a PhD in social anthropology and ethnomusicology from Queen's University Belfast in 1990, where he studied with John Blacking. From 2000–2009, he was Jefferson Smurfit Professor of Irish Studies and Professor of Music at the University of Missouri–St. Louis.

Since 2009, he is the inaugural holder of The Johnson Chair in Québec and Canadian Irish Studies at Concordia University, Montréal, Quebec. One of only a handful of universities offering a Major, Minor and Certificate in Irish Studies, the School of Canadian Irish Studies courses focus on Ireland's history and culture, its modern transformation in the Celtic Tiger era, and the social, cultural, economic, religious, educational and political contributions of Irish immigrants to Canada. The Johnson Chair focuses on the contributions of Quebecers of Irish origin to the social, cultural, religious and economic evolution of Québec.

Selected publications and productions
 Documentary Filmmaker, Lost Children of the Carricks, Celtic Crossings Productions, Montreal, 2019
 Author, A Short History Of Irish Traditional Music, O'Brien Press, Dublin, 2017
 Author, Flowing Tides–History and Memory in an Irish Soundscape, Oxford University Press, New York, 2016
 Author, A Pocket History of Irish Traditional Music, O'Brien Press, Dublin, 1998.
 Contributor, The Encyclopaedia of Music in Ireland (EMIR), University College Dublin Press, 2013.
 Contributor, Companion to Irish Traditional Music, Cork University Press.
 Contributor, The Celts in the Americas, University of Cape Breton Press, 2013.
 Producer, The Paddy Murphy Memorial Project: Preserving the Music and Legacy of a Pioneer of the Irish Concertina Paddy Murphy  (1913–1992)  Fiach Roe, County Clare, Ireland.
 Consultant, Photos to Send: Retracing Dorothy Lange’s Travels through Ireland, an award-winning documentary on the American photographer’s visit to Ireland in 1955.

Recordings
 Traditional Music From Clare and Beyond (Celtic Crossings, San Francisco, 1996) with Irish fiddlers Paddy Canny, Peader O'Loughlin, Martin Hayes
 Tracin' – Traditional Music from the West of Ireland, classic duet CD with fiddler Patrick Ourceau (Celtic Crossings, San Francisco, 1999)
 The Independence Suite – Traditional Music from Ireland, Scotland and Cape Breton (Celtic Crossings, San Francisco, 2004)
 Paddy Murphy: Field Recordings from a Pioneer of the Irish Concertina (2007), which was also published as a digital archive (Celtic Crossings, San Francisco, 2008)

References

External links
 Official Dr. Gearóid Ó hAllmhuráin website

1955 births
20th-century Irish musicians
21st-century Irish musicians
Alumni of Queen's University Belfast
Academic staff of Concordia University
Irish expatriates in Canada
Irish musicologists
Irish scholars and academics
Living people
Musicians from County Clare
University of Missouri–St. Louis faculty